Brett Docherty (born 4 March 1968) is an Australian former professional rugby league footballer who played for the Western Suburbs Magpies, Illawarra Steelers and Eastern Suburbs.

Born in the New South Wales town of Hay, Docherty played three first-grade seasons at Western Suburbs, as a fullback and occasional goalkicker.

In 1992 he joined Illawarra and had his biggest impact at the club before the season started, helping the Steelers to the Challenge Cup title. Playing as a winger, he scored the winning try in Illawarra's semi-final win over Cronulla, then kicked both of his side's penalties when they defeated the Brisbane Broncos 4-2 in the final. He kept his spot on the wing when the NSWRL season began, before later returning to fullback, in what would be his only season at Illawarra.

Docherty made a single first-grade appearance for Eastern Suburbs in 1993, before being signed by the Western Reds the following season as the Perth-based club looked to build its list for entry into the league in 1995.

References

External links
Brett Docherty at Rugby League project

1968 births
Living people
Australian rugby league players
Western Suburbs Magpies players
Illawarra Steelers players
Sydney Roosters players
Rugby league fullbacks
Rugby league wingers
Rugby league players from New South Wales
People from the Riverina